Galmi, Niger, is a village of about 8,000–10,000 residents. It is on the southern edge of the Sahara Desert is thus an arid area with a dry, rocky landscape.

Galmi is well known for its purple and red onions popular in West Africa. Onion farming in the village was the subject of the Nigerien documentary film For the Best and for the Onion.

A well-known landmark is the missions hospital, Galmi Hospital. The hospital compound is lush with vegetation from a local well compared to the surrounding area.

References

Populated places in Niger